Ben Ellis may refer to:
 Ben Ellis (playwright), Australian playwright
 Ben Ellis (rugby league) (born 1982), rugby player on the St George Dragons
 Ben Ellis (footballer) (1906–c. 1967), Motherwell F.C. and Wales international footballer
 Ben Ellis (baseball) (1870–1931), Major League Baseball infielder

See also 
 BenJarvus Green-Ellis (born 1985), American football player
 Ben James-Ellis (born 1988), musical theatre performer and contestant on the BBC television series Any Dream Will Do